Dobong District (도봉구, Dobong-gu) is one of the 25 districts of Seoul, South Korea.

Dobong has a population of 348,625 (2010) and has a geographic area of 20.8 km2 (8 sq mi), and is divided into four dong) (neighborhoods). The district is located in northeastern Seoul, bordering the Gyeonggi Province cities of Yangju and Uijeongbu to the north, and the Seoul city districts of Gangbuk to the southwest and Nowon to the east.

History
Dobong District was created in 1973 by splitting 22 administrative neighborhoods off from Seongbuk District. By 1979, some of these 22 original administrative neighborhoods had been subdivided, increasing the number of administrative neighborhoods in Dobong District to 35. In 1988, the sixteen administrative neighborhoods in Dobong-dong, Chang-dong, Wolgye-dong, Gongneung-dong, Hagye-dong, Junggye-dong, and Sanggye-dong were split off to form Nowon District, though the following year Dobong-dong and Chang-dong were returned to Dobong District. Then in 1995, the 18 administrative neighborhoods in Mia-dong, Suyu-dong, and Beon-dong were split off to form Gangbuk District, leaving Dobong District with its present 14 administrative neighborhoods.

Symbols
 Flower: Climbing rose
 Tree: Pine tree
 Bird: Pigeon

Mountain
Dobongsan (Dobong Mountain) is a mountain in Bukhansan National Park, partly under the jurisdiction of Dobong-gu. It is a popular leisure spot for district residents.

In addition, Dobongsan has many large and small temples such as Cheonchuksa, Wontongsa, and Manweolam.

Administrative divisions

Dobong-gu is composed of four legal-status neighborhoods which comprise a total of 14 administrative neighborhoods:
 Dobong-dong (도봉동 道峰洞) 1, 2
 Banghak-dong (방학동 放鶴洞) 1, 2, 3
 Ssangmun-dong (쌍문동 雙門洞) 1, 2, 3, 4
 Chang-dong (창동 倉洞) 1, 2, 3, 4, 5

Transportation

Railroad
Korail
Seoul Subway Line 1
(Uijeongbu) ← Dobongsan — Dobong — Banghak — Changdong — Nokcheon → (Nowon-gu)
Seoul Metro
Seoul Subway Line 4
(Nowon-gu) ← Chang-dong — Ssangmun → (Gangbuk-gu)
Seoul Metropolitan Rapid Transit Corporation
Seoul Subway Line 7
(Uijeongbu) ← Dobongsan → (Nowon-gu)

Education

Jawoon High School (2004)
Duksung Women's University

Sister cities
 Changping, China
 Donghae, South Korea

Notable people
 Lee Tae-min (born 1993), singer-songwriter, dancer, actor, and member of SHINee and SuperM
 Lee Seung-gi (born 1987), singer, actor, host, and entertainer
 Son Hyun-woo (Hangul: 손현우, born 1992), singer, dancer, actor, and member of Monsta X
 Yoon San-ha (Hangul: 윤산하, born 2000), singer and member of Astro

References

External links

 Official site 
 Official site 

 
1973 establishments in South Korea
Districts of Seoul